Gogolá or Ghogolá is a town in the Diu district, in the territory of the Union of Dadra and Nagar Haveli and Daman and Diu, in India. It is a continental enclave located on the peninsula of the same name.

References

Diu, India
Cities and towns in Diu district